John Goold (born 27 June 1941) is a former Australian rules footballer who represented  in the Victorian Football League (VFL) during the 1960s.

Family
John William Crosbie-Goold was born on 27 June 1941.

He married Joanna Darling Baillieu in March 1968.

Education
He attended Melbourne Grammar School, as a boarder, for 11 years.

Football
Recruited from Healesville.

Goold was a half back and played in two Carlton premiership sides. The first in 1968 saw him line up at centre half back and the second came two years later in the 1970 VFL Grand Final which would be his last league game. He represented Victoria at interstate football during his career, including 1966 when he wore the Big V at the Hobart Carnival and earned All-Australian selection as well as finishing second in the Tassie Medal voting. He also polled well in that year's Brownlow Medal, finishing in eighth place.

A fashion designer during his football career, after he retired he took up farming and horse-breeding.

Notes

References
 "John Goold: Happy 70th Birthday!", spiritofcarlton.com.au

External links
 
 John Goold, Blueseum profile
 Ed Goold, Blueseum profile
 

1941 births
People educated at Melbourne Grammar School
Australian rules footballers from Victoria (Australia)
Carlton Football Club players
Carlton Football Club Premiership players
All-Australians (1953–1988)
Australian polo players
Living people
Two-time VFL/AFL Premiership players